ASUS MeMO Pad HD 7 is a low-end low priced budget Android tablet manufactured by Taiwanese corporation Asus. The tablet was announced in June and released in July 2013. The device runs the operating system Android 4.2 (codename: Jelly Bean). The specifications include a 7-inch IPS LED display, 1.2 GHz quad-core ARM Cortex-A7 processor, 1 GB of RAM, a storage of 8 GB (whereof Android 4.2.2 occupies just short of 3.5 GB) or 16 GB, and 5 MP rear camera.

A successor with the model name Asus MeMO Pad 7 ME176 was announced on June 2, 2014, which had a new 64-bit Intel Atom Z3745 processor.

References

Android (operating system) devices
Asus products
Portable media players
Tablet computers